The 2015 Kentucky Wildcats football team (variously "Kentucky", "UK", or "Wildcats") represents the University of Kentucky in the 2015 NCAA Division I FBS football season. The Wildcats compete in its 122nd season and 82nd as a member of the Southeastern Conference (SEC) as part of its Eastern Division. The team is led by head coach Mark Stoops, which is his third year coaching the team, and the Wildcats play its home games at Commonwealth Stadium in Lexington, Kentucky.

After the completion of the 2014 season, the Wildcats signed one of their highest rated recruiting classes in February.  They completed their spring practice in April.

Pre-season

Previous season
In 2014–2015, the Wildcats lost their final six games of the season after starting the season 5–1, completing their second year under Mark Stoops at 5-7 and 2–6 in the SEC (6th-East). They lost to in-state rival Louisville 40–44 to end the season, missing out on their fourth consecutive bowl game since the 2010–2011 season when they lost to Pittsburgh in the BBVA Compass Bowl.

Fall camp

Personnel

Coaching staff
Kentucky head coach Mark Stoops enters his third year as the Wildcat's head coach for the 2015 season.  During his previous two seasons he led the Wildcats to an overall record of 7 wins and 17 losses.  Despite the losing record, he doubled his win total from his first season to his second.

On November 30, 2014 Offensive Coordinator Neal Brown accepted the Head Coach position at Troy, where he was an assistant from 2006 to 2009.  In his place Kentucky hired West Virginia Co-offensive Coordinator Shannon Dawson on December 19, 2014.

Special Teams coach Craig Naivar accepted a position  at Houston under his former colleague Tom Herman on December 18, 2014.  The position he vacated was filled by California assistant Andy Buh on February 4, 2015.  Stoops announced with Buh's hiring that the special teams would be a joint effort among multiple assistant coaches.

Transfers
Third string quarterback Maxwell Smith announced on January 11 that he would transfer to San Diego State for his senior season.

On January 14 running back Braylon Heard announced he would forgo his last season of eligibility and enter his name into the 2015 NFL Draft.  Heard rushed for 366 yards and four touchdowns, averaging 5.1 yards per carry in 2014.

On February 4 running back Josh Clemons announced he will transfer from the program in May after he receives his degree.

2015 signing class

Prior to National Signing Day on February 4, 2015, four players enrolled for the spring semester in order to participate in spring practice The early enrollments from high school included offensive lineman George Asafo-Adjei, tight end C.J. Conrad, defensive end Kengera Daniel, and linebacker Jordan Jones.

On National Signing Day, Alabama signed 18 additional players out of high school that completed the 2015 recruiting class. The class was highlighted by 2 players from the "ESPN 300": No. 214 Marcus Walker; and No. 244 Eli Brown. Kentucky signed a top-35 class according to Rivals.com, Scout.com and 247Sports.com.

In addition to those signed as part of the 2015 class, on December 12, 2014 Nebraska transfers, tight end Greg Hart and linebacker Courtney Love, announced they would enroll and join Kentucky's football team.  Due to health concerns of relatives, both players plan to apply for hardship waivers that would allow them to play in 2015 without sitting out due to NCAA transfer rules.

Returning starters

Offense

Defense

Special teams

Roster

Depth chart

Schedule
Kentucky announced their 2015 football schedule on October 14, 2014. The 2015 schedule consist of eight home games and four away games in the regular season for the first time since the 2007 season. The Wildcats will host SEC foes Auburn, Florida, Missouri, and Tennessee, and will travel to Georgia, Mississippi State, South Carolina, and Vanderbilt.

The Wildcats will host all non–conference play against Louisiana-Lafayette and Charlotte (both for the first time), and in–state rivals Eastern Kentucky and Louisville. The match–up against long–rival Tennessee will be held in October for the first time since 1909. Kentucky will also host Auburn on a Thursday night for the first home game on a Thursday night in program history.

Schedule Source:

Game summaries

Vs. Louisiana–Lafayette

Kentucky overcame a three-touchdown comeback by Louisiana-Lafayette with a late touchdown to defeat the Ragin' Cajuns 40–33 in the season opener for both teams.  This was the first game in the newly renovated Commonwealth Stadium.  The $120 million renovation includes player amenities such as a recruiting room and patio atop a tunnel leading to a new synthetic turf field. The Wildcats initially gave a sellout crowd of 62,933 something to feel good about on the field and in their seats before things turned sour.

Stanley "Boom" Williams' ran for a 75-yard TD on the game's first play. Williams' speed helped the Wildcats deliver just 16 seconds in. Last year's team rushing leader blew through a big hole up the middle and off for a big TD that brought a roar from the packed house before they got comfortable in their seats. He finished with 135 yards on 10 carries.

Patrick Towles' five-yard touchdown pass to Blake Bone provided a 33–10 lead late in the third quarter. But Austin MacGinnis' missed extra point opened the door for the Ragin' Cajuns to rally with TD runs of 56 and 26 yards by Torrey Pierce and a 23-yarder by Jalen Nixon.

Elijah McGuire's game-tying two point conversion run with 7:36 left created more anxiety, especially for Kentucky when Towles fumbled a fourth-and-1 snap at Louisiana's 49. The junior somehow recovered the ball for a two-yard gain to extend the drive.  Five plays later Horton's 12-yard run with 57 seconds remaining put Kentucky ahead for good.

Josh Forrest intercepted Brooks Haack's Hail Mary pass as time expired to preserve Kentucky's narrow win on a wild but long night that included a faulty game clock and even lightning in the near distance along with the drone crash.

Towles passed for 257 yards and TDs of 35 yards to Garrett Johnson, 37 to Jeff Badet and Bone.

At South Carolina

It was a tale of two halves, with Kentucky's offense scoring 24 unanswered first-half points before the Wildcat defense made big play after big play in the second half to secure Kentucky's first win at South Carolina since 1999.  Mark Stoops started the week reminding the Wildcats they hadn't had a winning road trip in his three-year tenure. They ended the week celebrating a 26 to 22 road victory at South Carolina on Saturday in front of 82,178 at Williams-Brice Stadium in Columbia. The victory for Kentucky broke a 22-game losing streak in road games with the Wildcats last road win coming at Louisville in September 2010. Kentucky's last SEC road victory was at Georgia in November 2009. UK is now 2–0 on the season and starts conference play with a victory for the first time since defeating Arkansas in 2007 in Fayetteville.

Heading into halftime with a 24–7 lead, South Carolina scored the first 15 points of the second half, including three Elliott Fry field goals and a 33-yard touchdown pass from Perry Orth, who was playing for injured Gamecock quarterback Conner Mitch, to Jerrell Adams, to cut the UK lead to 24–22.  The Gamecocks and head coach Steve Spurrier decided to go for the two-point conversion to try to tie the game before freshman Denzil Ware scooped up a fumble and returned it 98 yards for two points to give UK a 26–22 lead with 8:09 to go in the game. After a short drive by the UK offense, South Carolina started another drive on a tired Kentucky defense before another freshman made a big play with rookie cornerback Chris Westry earning his first-career interception to put the Wildcats back in the driver's seat.  The Wildcat offense, who struggled for much of the second half, sealed the victory from there, taking the final 4:32 off the clock, including a key 11-yard quarterback draw by Patrick Towles on third down to drain the Gamecocks of timeouts. Sophomore Stanley "Boom" Williams took over from there with a 25-yard rush to end the game.

Vs. Florida

Despite a sparkling defensive effort in which the Kentucky football team held Florida scoreless in the second half, a fourth-quarter rally fell short as Florida prevailed 14–9 on Saturday night in a front of a sold-out Commonwealth Stadium.  Trailing 14-3 going into the fourth quarter, the Wildcats made it a one-score game behind two Austin MacGinnis field goals and had the ball twice over the final five minutes in an attempt to score the go-ahead touchdown. Kentucky's final drive of the night began on its own 20-yard line and was dissipated by a Quincy Wilson interception on fourth-and-27 to lift the Gators to the win.

Kentucky's defense stymied the Gator attack for the entire second half. Five Wildcats registered six or more tackles on the night, led by Khalid Henderson's nine stops.   UK posted three tackles for a loss and J.D. Harmon picked off a pass in the end zone to halt a Florida drive in the middle of the third quarter that would have pushed UF's lead to three scores. The interception sparked a momentum change in the game as UK would go on to put together back-to-back scoring drives.

UK quarterback Patrick Towles was 8 of 24 on the night with 126 yards and two interceptions. Running back Stanley "Boom" Williams rushed 16 times for 80 yards – snapping his three-game 100-yard rushing streak. Dorian Baker led the receivers with four hauls for 38 yards, including a big fourth-down catch late in the game.  Florida's Will Grier threw for 125 yards and rushed for a team-high 61 yards that included a 1-yard touchdown scamper in the opening quarter.

Following Harmon's interception in the third quarter, Towles' 33-yard scramble highlighted a 75-yard drive by the Wildcats to inch closer at 14–6 with 14:50 in the fourth. MacGinnis connected on a 22-yard field goal for the Wildcats to make it a one-possession game.  After the UK defense forced a three-and-out, MacGinnis made it a five-point contest with 10:57 to go with a 45-yard field goal. Towles found Jeff Badet for a 45-yard strike down the left sideline to push the Wildcats into field-goal range as the drive's highlight.

Following UK's third field goal of the game, Florida managed one first down before being forced to punt with 8:34 remaining. Faced with a third-and-10 from its own 22, Towles found Baker open on the right sideline to keep the drive alive. Williams followed with a 14-yard rush, but the drive stalled at UK's 48. Punter Landon Foster pinned the Gators inside the 20 with 6:10 to go.   The Gators picked up two first downs and killed 3:44 of clock before punting back to the Wildcats, which began the final drive at their own 20. Towles and Baker hooked up for a 20-yard gain on fourth-and-3 at the Kentucky 27 to keep the drive alive. Florida sacked Towles for a loss of 12 on third-and-10 from the UK 47 and then the Wildcats committed a false start. Towels' deep ball down the left side line intended for Ryan Timmons was picked off by Wilson to preserve the Gators' victory.

Vs. Missouri

Patrick Towles guided Kentucky to two second-half touchdowns while pacing the Kentucky football team to a 21–13 victory over No. 25 Missouri.  Towles led UK to its first league victory at the New Commonwealth Stadium and its first win over a ranked opponent since 2010 when Kentucky defeated No. 9 South Carolina. The win over the Tigers signified the first win over a top-25 opponent in the Mark Stoops era.

Towles directed scoring drives in the third and fourth quarters to ignite the offensive effort in the second half. The junior gunslinger found CJ Conrad for a 24-yard strike before connecting with Dorian Baker with less than seven minutes to play to give the Wildcats a 14-point lead it would not relinquish.  Towles had his most consistent game of the season, connecting on 22-of-27 passes for 249 yards with the two touchdown passes. He also added a 14-yard scamper for a score in the opening half.

Defensively, C.J. Johnson paced the Wildcats with 11 tackles, besting his career high by five. Senior linebacker Josh Forrest added nine tackles, while Jason Hatcher posted eight stops to aid the stout defensive effort. Kentucky yielded just 14 points per game through its opening three games against SEC foes.

Kentucky, which had not won against Mizzou since the Tigers joined the SEC in 2012, had a number of player milestones as well. With his 6-yard carry with 1:24 remaining in the fourth quarter to help seal the victory, running back JoJo Kemp became the 34th Wildcat to rush for 1,000 yards in a career. The junior led the UK attack on the ground, racking up 66 yards on 13 attempts.  Garrett Johnson led the team in receiving with a season-high 119 yards, including a long of 35 yards that matched his season best. Conrad had a breakout game, not only recording his first career catch but also his first career touchdown with 55 yards of offense through the air. Baker also had a standout game, matching his career high of 51 yards and recording the second touchdown of his career.

Following a rocky start to the drive that found the Wildcats in a first-and-29 situation, Towles found Johnson for consecutive 20-plus-yard throws to move the chains and get UK into Missouri territory for the first time in the contest. Kentucky continued to cruise downfield, closing out the quarter on the 14-yard line.  The short break did not derail the Wildcats as Towles used the opening play of the second quarter to dodge and weave through the Tiger defense for a rushing touchdown. That knotted the score at seven apiece.   Much like the start of the game, the second half started slow before Missouri struck late in the third quarter. However, the Tigers were left to settle for a field goal in lieu of a touchdown with 6:04 remaining, with Andrew Baggett sending a 39-yarder through the uprights to give MU a slight 10–7 edge.

Kemp acted as the catalyst for the team, as three of his carries totaled a combined 37 yards, giving UK a first-and-goal late in the third quarter. Though Kemp moved the offense down the field for the bulk of the drive, it was Conrad who would complete it for the Wildcats, pulling down a perfect 24-yard toss from Towles for the first touchdown of his career. With the addition of the extra point, Kentucky was able to take its first lead of the game with just under two minutes remaining in the third quarter, leading by a count of 14–10.

Vs. (FCS) Eastern Kentucky

Despite trailing by 14 points with less than eight minutes in the fourth quarter, the Kentucky football team celebrated its 100th Homecoming anniversary at The New CWS in thrilling fashion, notching a 34-27 comeback overtime victory over in-state foe Eastern Kentucky.

Kentucky rallied from a 27–13 deficit late in the fourth quarter with back-to-back game-saving drives. Facing a fourth-and-3 at the end of regulation, Patrick Towles stood in the face of a blitz and found Dorian Baker for a 5-yard touchdown to force overtime.

The duo connected again in overtime with a 3-yard pitch-and-catch to take a 34–27 lead. CJ Johnson, who recorded 19 tackles, the most by a defensive lineman in program history, fittingly sealed the outcome with a game-clinching sack.  Eight of Johnson's 19 tackles were solo stops, including a sack and two-and-a-half tackles for loss. Ryan Flannigan was one tackle off his career best with 11 tackles, Josh Forrest recorded double-digit tackles with 10 stops on the night, and Farrington Huguenin blocked a field goal and recovered a fumble.

Coupled with 2014's opening five games, it marks the first time that UK has been 4-1 for two consecutive seasons since 1976–77.
 
Towles rebounded from a two-interception first half to lead the offense for the Wildcats, connecting on 29-of-42 pass attempts for 329 yards and three touchdowns to go along with a rushing score. Towles surpassed the 300-yard mark for the first time this season and the fourth of his career.  The duo of Baker and Blake Bone carried the offense in receiving with 86 and 85 yards, respectively. Both bested their career highs by more than 20 yards each, and Baker's two touchdowns, which included the game-tying and game-winning catches, is a career best for the wide receiver. 
 
The Wildcats retain an unblemished all-time record against the Colonels and advance to 4–1 on the season with the victory.

Vs. Auburn

Kentucky scored 17 second-half points and rallied to within one score, but the Auburn Tigers held on for a 30–27 win in front of 63,407 fans in The New Commonwealth Stadium on Thursday night. Auburn earned a 10-point advantage at 30–20 with less than eight minutes to play before the Wildcats pulled to within three following a Mikel Horton 1-yard plunge. Kentucky was able to get the ball back with 2:12 remaining, but UK failed to convert on fourth-and-3 from the Auburn 44 to allow the Tigers to clinch the victory.

Patrick Towles posted more than 300 yards of offense for the second consecutive game, racking up 359 yards on 27-of-44 passing with one interception. The junior gunslinger had five 20-plus-yard tosses for the evening, including a pair of throws longer than 35 yards.  Garrett Johnson was Towles' primary target for the long ball, as he posted a career-best 160 yards receiving, including a season-long 39-yard catch that started a drive to help the Wildcats chip away at a 10-point deficit in the second quarter.  Marcus McWilson led the way for the UK defense, tying his career best in total tackles after making 10 stops. Josh Forrest was not far behind with nine tackles, and Jason Hatcher also matched his career mark with seven takedowns.

For the Tigers, Sean White led the team on 17-of-27 passing for 255 yards, 154 of which went into the hands of Ricardo Louis to lead the team in receiving. On the ground, Peyton Barber rushed for 92 yards and two touchdowns, while Kerryon Johnson added 36 yards and a touchdown for Auburn.

Kentucky's running backs paced the team in scoring, with Stanley "Boom" Williams returning to action to rush for 113 yards and two touchdowns, including a 60-yard sprint that the sophomore would follow up with the opening touchdown for the Wildcats. Horton also notched a touchdown for the Wildcats, making the most of his five carries in the third quarter to bring UK within three points of the Tigers in the final minutes of the game.

At Mississippi State

Mississippi State scored 21 points in the second quarter behind the impressive play of Bulldog senior quarterback Dak Prescott, handing Kentucky its first road loss of the season, 42–16, at Davis Wade Stadium in Starkville, Miss.

Prescott was the star of the game, going 25-for-35 through the air for 348 yards and three touchdowns, while rushing 13 times for 117 yards and three touchdowns. Brandon Holloway was the team's second-leading rusher, carrying the ball six times for 36 yards. Holloway was also the team's leading receiver with five catches for 98 yards and a touchdown.

Kentucky quarterback Patrick Towles went 23-for-42 in the game for 218 yards and two interceptions, rushing six times for 13 yards and a touchdown. Boom Williams was the leading rusher for Kentucky, carrying the ball 18 times for 95 yards, including a 25-yard rush. Dorian Baker had seven receptions for 56 yards, while tight end C.J. Conrad had a career game with six receptions for 56 yards and sophomore Garrett "Juice" Johnson had five catches for 74 yards.

Vs. Tennessee

The Volunteers, any way you slice it, were dominant in their first trip to The New Commonwealth Stadium. They gained nearly 500 yards, limited UK to only two offensive touchdowns, forced a pair of turnovers and scored touchdowns on kick and punt returns.

When UK seized even the tiniest bit of momentum, Tennessee took it right back, starting after C.J. Johnson picked up a sack-fumble forced by Marcus McWilson and returned it 77 yards for a 7-0 Wildcat lead. It was the first of two times in the opening half UK went ahead, but that did not stop the Volunteers from scoring 14 points over the final 5:26 before halftime to take a 24–14 lead.

At Georgia

The University of Georgia football team scored 14 points in the third quarter to open up a 21-point lead and roll to a 27–3 victory over Kentucky. The two teams traded field goals for the remainder of the first half with Marshall Morgan hitting from 22 yards and UK's Austin MacGinnis hitting from 32 yards to cut the UGA halftime lead to 10–3. Georgia took control of the game in the third quarter. Kentucky received the opening kickoff of the second half and elected to go for it on fourth-and-short near midfield, but could not covert. The Bulldogs took advantage of the open field, marching 52 yards down the field with Sony Michel's one-yard scoring rush giving UGA a 17–3 lead.

The Bulldogs added to that lead late in the third quarter when Keith Marshall scored on a 10-yard pass from quarterback Greyson Lambert to put UGA up 24–3. Georgia added a 27-yard field goal by Morgan in the fourth quarter to put the finishing touches on the 27–3 victory.

At Vanderbilt

Sophomore running back Stanley "Boom" Williams rushed 13 times for 115 yards on Saturday as Kentucky fell to Vanderbilt 21–17 in Nashville. Williams had rushes of 66 and 38 yards in his return from an elbow injury. Kentucky (4-6, 2-6 SEC) got on the board first in the game, as Austin MacGinnis hit a 38-yard field goal in the first quarter. But Vandy took its first lead later in that period when Kyle Shurmur hit Kyle Anderton for a four-yard touchdown to give the Commodores a 7–3 lead. nIn the second quarter, Kentucky got into the end zone when redshirt freshman quarterback Drew Barker connected with Ryan Timmons on a seven-yard pass to make it 10-7 Kentucky. That marked Barker's first career touchdown pass.

On Kentucky's next possession, Barker was intercepted by Oren Burks, who returned the pick 30 yards for a touchdown to give Vanderbilt a 14–10 lead before the half. Vanderbilt (4-6, 2-4 SEC) tacked on another touchdown before the half when Shurmur connected with Caleb Scott on a 37-yard pass, giving the Commodores a 21–10 lead at the break. The second half was largely dominated by the defenses. In fact, the only score after the break came when Kentucky running back Jojo Kemp found the end zone from two yards out with 1:06 left in the third quarter, pulling Kentucky within four points.

Vs. Charlotte

For the first time in five weeks, Kentucky players and coaches happily talked about building on a victorious performance instead of wondering what might have been in defeat.  In fact, the Wildcats executed so well against Charlotte that topping the effort might be tough.  Jojo Kemp rushed for three touchdowns, Boom Williams ran for two and Kentucky rolled up 544 yards in a 58-10 blowout of Charlotte Saturday night that ended a five-game losing streak.

Kemp broke TD runs of 6, 18, and 47 yards, Williams scored from 20 and 53 yards and Sihiem King added a 62-yarder as Kentucky (5-6) rushed for 415 yards, fourth most in school history.  Mike Edwards returned an interception 20 yards for another Wildcats score that handed the 49ers (2-9) their ninth straight loss.  Redshirt freshman Drew Barker added 129 yards passing in his first career start for Kentucky, which earned the first of two wins needed to reach the threshold for bowl eligibility. The Wildcats' defense held Charlotte to just 233 yards, recorded four sacks and forced three turnovers.  Miles Butler kicked field goals of 21, 46 and 32 yards for Kentucky.  Kentucky registered 50 points for the first time since August 2014 against UT Martin, and their 48-point victory margin was its largest since beating UTEP 77–17 in 2002.

Vs. Louisville

The Kentucky Wildcats raced out to a 21–0 lead in the first quarter but could not hold on, as Louisville rallied for a 38–24 win at Commonwealth Stadium on Saturday. Kentucky received the opening kickoff and marched down the field, taking a 7–0 lead on a one-yard rush by quarterback Drew Barker. After an A.J. Stamps interception, Kentucky took advantage of a short field, going 13 yards in two plays, capped off by a six-yard touchdown rush by Boom Williams to make it 14-0 Kentucky.

On Louisville's next possession, Kentucky intercepted Louisville quarterback Kyle Bolin for the second time, and Josh Forrest returned the pick 81 yards for a touchdown to make it 21–0, still in the first quarter. Louisville got on the board late in the first quarter when backup quarterback Lamar Jackson rushed 16 yards for a score to make it 21–7. In the second quarter, Kentucky added a 20-yard field goal by Miles Butler to take a 24–7 lead, which would be the halftime score. Louisville rallied in the second half, eventually taking the lead late in the third quarter, and going on to the victory. Dorian Baker had three catches for 94 yards for Kentucky, while Mikel Horton had 44 yards on the ground to lead the Cats.

Team statistics

Rankings

References

Kentucky
Kentucky Wildcats football seasons
Kentucky Wildcats football